Nggem is a Papuan language of Indonesian the Indonesian New Guinea Highlands.

References

Dani languages